Hendrik "Rik" Cornelis (September 18, 1910–1999) was a Belgian colonial civil servant who served as the final Governor-General of the Belgian Congo from 1958 to 1960. His term ended with the independence of the Republic of the Congo.

Cornelis was born in Bevere, near Oudenaarde, in the Belgian province of East Flanders on 18 September 1910. He gained a doctorate in economic science from the University of Ghent, also spending a year at the Geneva School for International Studies. He joined the Belgian colonial administration in Ruanda-Urundi in 1934 and later served in various roles in the Congo. He was promoted to vice-governor-general of the Belgian Congo in 1953. He became the governor-general on 12 July 1958, being the first Dutch-speaking appointee to the role.

After the independence of the Belgian Congo in 1960, Cornelis served as an advisor to Justin Bomboko during his presidency of the College of Commissioners established by Joseph-Désiré Mobutu.

References

Sources

Further reading

External links
 Cornelis, Rik in NEVB Online
 Gouverneurs du Congo
 Congo (Kinshasa)
 Archive Henri Cornelis, Royal museum for central Africa

1910 births
1999 deaths
20th-century Belgian civil servants
Governors-General of the Belgian Congo
People from Oudenaarde
Ghent University alumni
Geneva School of Diplomacy and International Relations alumni